Sabina Schulze (born 19 March 1972) is a retired German swimmer who won a gold medal in the 4 × 100 m freestyle relay at the 1986 World Aquatics Championships, setting a new world record. Two years later she won a gold medal in the same event at the 1988 Summer Olympics.

Schulze was born in a family of track and field athletes. Her father Jens Schulze and mother Karin Rüger competed in high jump, and the mother took part in the 1964 and 1968 Olympics. Her brother Thomas specialized in shot put, but Sabina and another brother Michael went into swimming. After marriage she changed her last name to Kessler.

References

1972 births
Living people
Olympic swimmers of East Germany
Olympic gold medalists for East Germany
Swimmers at the 1988 Summer Olympics
German female freestyle swimmers
Swimmers from Leipzig
Medalists at the 1988 Summer Olympics
World Aquatics Championships medalists in swimming